Buciumeni is a commune in Galați County, Western Moldavia, Romania with a population of 2,326 people. It is composed of four villages: Buciumeni, Hănțești, Tecucelu Sec, and Vizurești.

Natives
 Smaranda Brăescu (1897–1948), parachuting and aviation pioneer

References

Communes in Galați County
Localities in Western Moldavia